Jamal Wesley Sampson (born May 15, 1983) is an American former professional basketball player.

A power forward / center, Sampson is the cousin of the 1983 NBA draft's number one overall pick Ralph Sampson. He attended the University of California, Berkeley where he played only one season before being selected by the Utah Jazz in the second round (47th overall) of the 2002 NBA draft. He was then  traded along with Ryan Humphrey to the Orlando Magic for Curtis Borchardt. The Magic then traded Sampson to the Milwaukee Bucks for Rashard Griffith.

After barely playing with the Bucks, Sampson was signed by the Los Angeles Lakers, appearing in only 10 games. He was later selected by the Charlotte Bobcats in the expansion draft in 2004, and signed as a free agent with the Sacramento Kings in 2005–06. On July 28, 2006, Sampson signed with the Denver Nuggets and played a further 22 NBA games.

Sampson's final NBA game was played on April 18th, 2007 in a 100 - 77 victory over the San Antonio Spurs where Sampson recorded 13 rebounds, 2 blocks, but no points in 27 minutes of playing time.

Sampson was waived by the Dallas Mavericks on October 22, 2007 during the NBA preseason.

In 2009, he signed with the Smart Gilas developmental team in the Philippines, replacing C. J. Giles as the team's candidate to be a naturalized player for future international competitions.

Sampson later moved on to China, playing for the Liaoning Dinosaurs, Dongguan Leopards and Shanxi Zhongyu Brave Dragons.

In November 2011, Sampson was selected by the Texas Legends with the fifth pick in the NBA D-League Draft.

In early December 2011, Sampson joined the Boston Celtics for training camp. On December 22, 2011, the Celtics announced that they had waived Sampson.

In 2012, Sampson became an assistant coach for Brethren Christian Junior/Senior High School.

Career statistics

NBA

|-
| align="left" | 2002–03
| align="left" | Milwaukee
| 5 || 0 || 1.6 || .000 || .000 || .000 || 0.4 || 0.2 || 0.2 || 0.0 || 0.0
|-
| align="left" | 2003–04
| align="left" | Los Angeles
| 10 || 2 || 13.0 || .478 || .000 || .583 || 5.2 || 0.7 || 0.2 || 0.4 || 2.9
|-
| align="left" | 2004–05
| align="left" | Charlotte
| 23 || 0 || 14.3 || .452 || .000 || .590 || 5.3 || 0.3 || 0.2 || 0.7 || 3.4
|-
| align="left" | 2005–06
| align="left" | Sacramento
| 12 || 0 || 3.3 || .714 || .000 || .000 || 1.5 || 0.4 || 0.0 || 0.3 || 0.8
|-
| align="left" | 2006–07
| align="left" | Denver
| 22 || 3 || 5.7 || .643 || .000 || .429 || 2.2 || 0.2 || 0.1 || 0.3 || 1.1
|- class="sortbottom"
| style="text-align:center;" colspan="2"| Career
| 72 || 5 || 8.8 || .491 || .000 || .537 || 3.4 || 0.4 || 0.1 || 0.4 || 2.0
|}

College

|-
| align="left" | 2001–02
| align="left" | California
| 32 || 31 || 24.9 || .426 || .000 || .526 || 6.5 || 1.2 || 0.5 || 1.7 || 6.4
|- class="sortbottom"
| style="text-align:center;" colspan="2"| Career
| 32 || 31 || 24.9 || .426 || .000 || .526 || 6.5 || 1.2 || 0.5 || 1.7 || 6.4
|}

References

External links
NBA.com profile
NBA.com bio (archive)

College & NBA stats
Cal Bears profile

1983 births
Living people
American expatriate basketball people in China
American expatriate basketball people in Germany
American expatriate basketball people in Jordan
American expatriate basketball people in the Philippines
American men's basketball players
Basketball players from California
California Golden Bears men's basketball players
Centers (basketball)
Charlotte Bobcats expansion draft picks
Charlotte Bobcats players
Denver Nuggets players
Liaoning Flying Leopards players
Los Angeles Lakers players
Milwaukee Bucks players
Parade High School All-Americans (boys' basketball)
People from Greater Los Angeles
Power forwards (basketball)
Sacramento Kings players
Shanxi Loongs players
Shenzhen Leopards players
Skyliners Frankfurt players
Texas Legends players
Utah Jazz draft picks
Zain Club basketball players